Frank Allen (28 June 1927 – 2014) was an English professional footballer who played in the Football League for Chesterfield and Mansfield Town.

References

1927 births
2014 deaths
English footballers
Association football midfielders
English Football League players
Chesterfield F.C. players
Mansfield Town F.C. players